Michael Allen Jones (born November 18, 1981) is an American rapper. He reached national fame in 2004 on Swishahouse with the release of his breakout single "Still Tippin'" (featuring Slim Thug and Paul Wall), which peaked at number 60 on the Billboard Hot 100. Jones subsequently released his single "Back Then", which peaked at number 22 on the Billboard. "Still Tippin'" and "Back Then" acted as singles for his debut studio album Who Is Mike Jones?, released on April 19, 2005, which peaked at number 3 on the US Billboard 200 and is certified platinum by the Recording Industry Association of America (RIAA).

Jones initially became recognized for his catchphrase "Mike Jones, who?" (or, "who is Mike Jones?"), which he would usually repeat several times on songs. He also became known for handing out shirts with his cell phone number printed on the back. The two went on to be trademarks of Jones throughout his music career.

Biography

Early life 
Mike Jones originally wanted to be a National Basketball Association player who rapped on the side. He transferred from school to school many times, forcing him to only play in YMCA leagues due to transfer rules after the ninth grade. Jones dropped out of Booker T. Washington High School and briefly took jobs at fast food restaurants. He worked at a Compaq plant and sold cell phones from an apartment on Antoine Drive. T. Brown, Jones's partner in several financial ventures, said that he sold some "dime bags" for six months, but the two mainly bought "T-Mobile Sidekicks" and sold them for an inexpensive price.

Jones often visited his grandmother's house in the Studewood area of Houston. He credits her with giving him the ideas to pursue rap, to use his real name, and to write songs for strippers.

Music career

Early career 
Jones began his musical career in a group called Souf Folk, using the alias Sache. He released one album with Souf Folk called Country Thuggin. In 2001, Jones formed his own independent record label, Ice Age Entertainment, and began solo rapping. He independently promoted and distributed his music on the streets and pressed it on DJs at strip clubs.

Jones eventually signed to upcoming southern record label Swishahouse after meeting with Swishahouse A&R T. Farris. At that time, Swishahouse was signing fellow upcoming southern rappers Slim Thug, Paul Wall and Chamillionaire. Farris recalled signing Jones, saying, "I heard him on one of my partner’s mixtapes and I wanted to meet him and try to get him to rap on our mixtapes. We linked up, signed him." DJ Casual from Meridian, Mississippi was the first person to play Jones on the radio. He loved what Jones was doing and passed it on to several fellow DJs.

2004–07: Who Is Mike Jones? and The American Dream EP 
In 2004 after the release of his breakout single "Still Tippin'", which was receiving much radio play, Jones signed a major deal to Jive Records and Warner Bros. He quickly released his second single, "Back Then", which eventually went Platinum, making it Jones's first Platinum single. On April 19, 2005, Jones released his debut album, Who Is Mike Jones? After two months the album also achieved Platinum status, eventually reaching double Platinum. It is Jones's highest selling album to date.

After leaving Jive Records Jones signed to a distribution deal with Asylum Records for his label Ice Age. In September 2006 Jones released the single titled "Mr. Jones". It debuted at #92 on the Billboard Charts. The song gained further recognition when fellow rapper Lil Wayne freestyled on his version "Sky Is The Limit" for his "Da Drought 3" mixtape. On January 31, 2007, Jones announced an upcoming EP and a movie, both titled The American Dream. On April 21, 2007, Jones released the second single from the EP, titled "My 64", featuring Bun B and Snoop Dogg. The single debuted at #1 on the Bubbling Under Hot 100 Singles chart. On November 20, 2007, Jones released The American Dream it debuted on the Billboard charts at #183.

2008–09: The Voice 
On November 27, 2007, Jones released the debut single "Drop & Gimme 50" for his second solo album, titled The Voice. "Drop & Gimme 50" featured Hurricane Chris. On May 19, 2008, Jones released the album's second single, called "Cuddy Buddy". The single did well on the Billboard Hot 100, debuting at #78. On December 2, 2009, the third single from The Voice was released. Titled "Next To You, it debuted on the Billboard Hot 100 at #63. On April 28, 2009 The Voice was released, debuting on the Billboard 200 at #12 and selling 25,000 copies its first week.

2012–2020: Hiatus, unreleased Where Is Mike Jones? album, unreleased WHO!Print album and mixtapes 
During 2010 and 2011, Jones went on a hiatus. On August 20, 2012, he announced his return, explaining the reason for his hiatus was due to financial disputes with his former label, Asylum Records and that money had been taken from him. He announced he was finished with his next album, Where Is Mike Jones? and that he was working on its follow-up, titled WHO!Print, with further plans to release a mixtape called Ballin Underground 2.

On October 31, 2013, Jones would release a mixtape titled Back Ballin' Underground.

On August 28, 2014, during an interview Jones would talk about his upcoming album Where is Mike Jones?, his upcoming mixtape Money Train and would announce he had signed a new distribution deal with Atlantic Records stating "It's just a group of people who are all about making money and having money. Once people really understand what the Money Train is, then they'll be onboard with it." On December 28, 2014, Jones released a new single titled "3 Grams" featuring appearances from Slim Thug and Yung Duece.

On January 1, 2015, Jones released a mixtape titled Money Train. On February 5, 2015, Jones announced via his Instagram he was working on another mixtape entitled Money Train: Reloaded which will be a sequel to his mixtape Money Train.

2021-present: Guap Season 
In September 2021, Jones announced a new record deal with RBC Records to release his third studio album Guap Season in May 2022.

Other ventures

Acting career 
His first acting role was a minor part in the Fox television series Prison Break as Darius Morgan, C-Note's brother-in-law. In 2007, Jones released his movie The American Dream, in which he starred, with much of the plot based on his life.

House of Dobbe 
Jones has his own line of Cognac called "House of Dobbe".

Personal life

Philanthropy 
Jones has been actively involved in many charity programs, such as his Ice Age for Kids and The American Dream Foundation, through which he hosted community youth events and donated thousands of dollars to help.

Controversy

Chamillionaire 
In 2004, Chamillionaire called out the rest of the Houston hip hop scene because he felt like they weren't representing the best of what Houston had to offer, lyrically, and urged them to improve in order to gain the recognition he believes Houston deserves. In response, Swishahouse took offense and replied by criticizing Chamillionaire. Chamillionaire then accused Jones, a past member of Swishahouse, of slander. As a result, the first CD of The Mixtape Messiah included insults directed at Jones, including the tracks "You Got Wrecked", "Who They Want", and "Game Over".

On February 10, 2007, YouTube user FDTV Video Podcast uploaded a parody video of Chamillionaire shooting Jones. It ridiculed Jones and was the subject of some small further controversy. However, in late 2008, the beef between the pair had died down. Chamillionaire apologized to Jones in 2010, marking an official end to their dispute. He said, live on stage, "From the bottom of my heart, I apologize to Mike Jones for the triple disc Mixtape Messiah 1 diss tracks. I mean no disrespect."

Trae Tha Truth 
On August 12, 2008, at the Ozone Awards, Jones got into a physical altercation with fellow Houston rapper Trae The Truth, who punched Jones three times—once in the back, once in the face, and once on the nose. The last punch broke Jones's nose. They have since resolved their issues and are now reconciled.

Discography 

 Who Is Mike Jones? (2005)
 The Voice (2009)
 Guap Season (TBA)

Filmography

References

External links 
 Official website
 

1981 births
Living people
21st-century American businesspeople
Male actors from Houston
American drink industry businesspeople
African-American businesspeople
African-American male actors
African-American male rappers
American male film actors
American male television actors
American music industry executives
American philanthropists
Businesspeople from Texas
Rappers from Houston
Southern hip hop musicians
Warner Music Group artists
Atlantic Records artists
Warner Records artists
Asylum Records artists
Hypnotic Records artists
21st-century American rappers
21st-century American male musicians
21st-century African-American musicians
20th-century African-American people